The 2014 FAM Women's Football Championship (also known as STO Noofahi Women's Football Championship, as the main sponsor is STO), is the second season of the FAM Women's Football Championship. The competition began on 8 June 2014.

Teams
4 teams participated in the competition.

 Maldives National Defence Force (MNDF)
 New Radiant W.S.C.
 Police Club
 Sun Hotels and Resorts

League round
''Times are Islamabad, Karachi (UTC+5).
Top 3 teams among this league round will be qualifies for the semi finals.

Semi final
Top 2 teams of the League Round will be the teams to play in the first semi final match and the winners will directly get their place in the final. Loser of this match will have to play in the second semi final match against the third team in the League round. Winner of this second semi final match will be the second team to play in the final.

Final

Awards

Most promising player
 Fathimath Shaila Afzal (SHR)

Best player
 Oinam Bembem Devi (NRWSC)

Best 4 players
 Oinam Bembem Devi (NRWSC)
 Fadhuwa Zahir (NRWSC)
 Aiminath Zahiya (MNDF)
 Hajra Khan (SHR)
 Aishath Mahin (SHR)

Top goal scorer
 Oinam Bembem Devi (NRWSC)

Fair play team
 Sun Hotels and Resorts

References

External links
 Women's Championship at Haveeru Online

FAM Women's Football Championship
Women
2014 in women's association football